Sur or SUR or El Sur (Spanish "the South") may refer to:

Geography
 Sur or Shur (Bible), the wilderness of Sur/Shur from the Book of Exodus
 Sur (river), a river of Bavaria, Germany
 Súr, a village in Hungary
 Sur, a district of the city of Diyarbakir in Turkey
 Sur, Diyarbakır, a historic district of Diyarbakır Province, Turkey
 Sur, Iran (disambiguation), places in Iran
 Sur, Oman, the easternmost major town in Oman
 Sur, Switzerland, a village in the canton of Grisons
 Big Sur, a coastline of California
 Sur State, a princely state of India merged with Idar State in 1821
 Tyre, Lebanon (Arabic: صور, Ṣūr; Phoenician: צור, Ṣur; Turkish: Sur), a city in the South Governorate of Lebanon

People
 Sur (Pashtun tribe), a Pashtun tribe in Afghanistan, Pakistan and India
 Sur (poet), a 16th-century blind Bhakti saint, poet and musician
 Sur Dynasty, Pashtun Dynasty which ruled northern India between 1540 and c. 1555
 Sur language, a minor Plateau language of Nigeria

Arts, entertainment, and media

Films
 Sur (film), a 1988 Argentine film directed by Fernando Solanas
 Sur, a 1970 Mexican film directed by Gabriel Retes
 El Sur (film) 1983 film by Víctor Erice, based on the novella by Adelaida García Morales
Los Cuentos de Borges: El Sur (film) 1992 film by Carlos Saura
 Sur – The Melody of Life, a 2002 Indian film directed by Tanuja Chandra

Literature
 "Sur" (short story), a short story by Ursula K. Le Guin
"El Sur" (story) ("The South"), a short story by Jorge Luis Borges
El Sur, a novella by Adelaida García Morales, basis of the film El Sur

Music
 "Sur" (tango), well known tango song composed by Homero Manzi and Aníbal Troilo
 Sur, a 1987 album by Uruguayan singer Jaime Roos
 Sur, a chapter in Sindhi music and poetry
 Svara (स्वर), sometimes spelled sur, the seven notes of the Indian musical scale

Periodicals
Sur (magazine), former literary journal published in Buenos Aires, backed by Victoria Ocampo
El Sur (newspaper)

Television
 Canal Sur, TV channel in Andalusia, Spain
 TeleSUR, a Latin-American TV channel

Transport
 Summer Beaver Airport (IATA airport code SUR), southwest of the First Nations community of Nibinamik, Ontario, Canada
 Surbiton railway station (National Rail station code SUR), London, England

Other uses
 SUR, the ISO code for the Soviet rouble, the currency of the Soviet Union
 Sur (currency), the proposed common currency of Brazil and Argentina
 Seemingly unrelated regressions, or SUR, a statistical technique for analysing multivariate data
 SS Sur, a Panamanian coaster in service 1955–65 
 Sur La Table, an American kitchenware company
 Sur offering, a burnt offering in Tibetan Buddhism
 Sur SC, a sports club based in Sur, Oman
 Sulfonylurea receptor, or SUR, the molecular target of sulfonylurea antidiabetic drugs
 Sydney University Regiment, or SUR, a regiment of the Australian Army
 SUR - Standard Unit Rate (UK electricity and gas measurement)

See also
 South (disambiguation)
 Suriname
 Surr, a game played in India